Richard Ndambu Wolang (born 10 March 1952) is a politician of the Democratic Republic of the Congo, and the governor of Bandundu Province.

References

1952 births
Living people
Governors of provinces of the Democratic Republic of the Congo
People from Bandundu Province
Place of birth missing (living people)